Prison Break is the first soundtrack of the American television series Prison Break, composed by Ramin Djawadi, and was released in 2007, bringing together the music used for seasons 1 and 2. Released in August 2007, the album includes 31 songs composed specially for seasons 1 and 2 of Prison Break, although several of these titles were included in the following seasons.

The album contains only the creations of Ramin Djawadi; as such, all other music or songs used in the series are not present. "Main Titles" was nominated for a Primetime Emmy Award in 2006.

Track listing
All music by Ramin Djawadi.

Credits and personnel
Personnel adapted from the album liner notes.

 Tom Berg – Tattoo Art
 Tompa Berg – Tattoo Art
 Tom Cavanaugh – Music Business Affairs
 Ramin Djawadi – Arranger, Audio Production, Composer, Primary Artist, Producer
 Carol Farhat – Music Production Supervisor
 David Klotz – Music Editor
 Robert Kraft – Executive in Charge of Music

 Erick Labson – Mastering
 Matthew Joseph Peak – Package Design
 Jacquie Perryman – Executive in Charge of Music
 Rob Simon – Compilation Producer, Technical Score Advisor
 Michelle Silverman – Music Supervisor
 Robert Townson – Executive Producer

References 

Album
2007 soundtrack albums
Ramin Djawadi soundtracks
Television soundtracks
Varèse Sarabande soundtracks